The Treviglio–Bergamo railway is a railway line in Lombardy, Italy. The railway infrastructure is managed by the Rete Ferroviaria Italiana, which classifies it as one of its complementary lines. The passenger service is operated by Trenord as a regional service.

History 
The line was planned in the last years of the Austrian domination of Lombardy, and opened in 1857 before the Second Italian War of Independence.

It was electrified in 1954.

References

Footnotes

Sources
 
 
  
 Trenord timetable

See also 
 List of railway lines in Italy

Railway lines in Lombardy
Railway lines opened in 1857
1857 establishments in the Austrian Empire